Indlamu denotes several items:

 Indlamu (dress),  the traditional short beaded skirt of young Swazi maidens during the Umhlanga (Reed Dance).
 Indlamu (dance) (Zoeloedans), traditional dance of the Zulu people of South Africa

as well as 
 Indlamu (Zulu), clan of the Zulu people
 Indlamu (Ndebele), tribe of the Ndebele of Simbabwe